The France national under-19 football team is the national under-19 football team of France and is controlled by the French Football Federation. The team competes in the annual UEFA European Under-19 Football Championship. They were the 2010 champions of the competition having won on home soil. The under-19 team also contests the qualification matches needed to play in the FIFA U-20 World Cup, though the competition is classified as an under-20 tournament.

Players

Current squad 
 The following players were called up for the 2023 UEFA European Under-19 Championship qualification matches.
 Match dates: 16, 19 and 22 November 2022
 Opposition: ,  and Caps and goals correct as of: 26 September 2022, after the match against 

Recent callups
The following players have also been called up to the France under-19 squad and remain eligible:

 Previous squads 
UEFA U-19 European Championships squads
2019 UEFA European U-19 Championship squads – France
2018 UEFA European U-19 Championship squads – France
2016 UEFA European U-19 Championship squads – France
2015 UEFA European U-19 Championship squads – France
2013 UEFA European U-19 Championship squads – France
2012 UEFA European U-19 Championship squads – France
2010 UEFA European U-19 Championship squads – France
2009 UEFA European U-19 Championship squads – France
2007 UEFA European U-19 Championship squads – France
2005 UEFA European U-19 Championship squads – France
2003 UEFA European U-19 Championship squads – France

Competitive record

UEFA European U-19 Championship record

*Draws include knockout matches decided by penalty shootout. 
**Gold background colour indicates that the tournament was won.
***Red border colour indicates tournament was held on home soil.

 2022 UEFA European Under-19 Championship 

 Qualified teams for the final tournament 

The following teams qualified for the final tournament of the 2022 UEFA European Under-19 Championship.

Note: All appearance statistics include only U-19 era (since 2002).

HonoursUEFA European Under-19 Football Championship (8)''':
 1949, 1983, 1996, 1997, 2000, 2005, 2010, 2016

References

External links

Official site 

Under-19
European national under-19 association football teams
Youth football in France